Reggie 'n' Bollie (formerly Menn on Poinnt) are a Ghanaian music duo consisting of Reggie Zippy and Bollie Babeface. They formed in 2012 and are best known for finishing as runners-up on the twelfth series of The X Factor UK in 2015.

Overview
Reggie 'n' Bollie are Reggie Zippy (born Reginald Ainooson, 16 July 1984) and Bollie Babeface (born Ishmael Hamid, 2 July 1986). "Bollie" is an acronym of "Best of Lyrical Lines in Entertainment".

They have been living in the UK with their families since 2010. Reggie released three songs in 2006 called "Virgin", "4 Sale" and "Adoma". In 2004, Bollie also had a hit called "You May Kiss the Bride", which is popular at weddings. In 2017, they were guest presenters for the CBBC music show, The Playlist.

Personal life 
In August 2021, Zippy's lost his mother.

The X Factor
In 2015, Reggie 'n' Bollie (then known as Menn on Poinnt) auditioned for the twelfth series of The X Factor. They made it all the way to judges' houses, where they were mentored by Cheryl Fernandez-Versini and were seen as a shock choice for the live shows. With the eliminations of Alien Uncovered in week 1 and 4th Impact in week 5, Reggie 'n' Bollie became Fernandez-Versini's sole remaining act in the competition. They were never in the bottom two or bottom three during any week and subsequently became the first duo to make the live final since Same Difference in 2007. During the final, they duetted with Fuse ODG and Craig David. They were announced as runners-up in the final, losing out to Louisa Johnson. The duo took part in The X Factor Live Tour 2016.

Reggie 'n' Bollie signed to Syco Music on 20 January 2016. They released their first single "New Girl" on 13 May through Syco. It reached number 26 on the UK Singles Chart. Their second single, "Link Up", released on 9 December 2016, failed to chart.

On 1 February 2017, Reggie 'n' Bollie announced they had parted ways with Syco and set up their own independent record label, called F.R.O.D Music. The duo switched on the Christmas lights in Farnborough on 18 November 2017.

On 15 December 2017, Reggie 'n' Bollie released their album Uncommon Favours through F.R.O.D Music.

Discography

Album
 Uncommon Favours (2017)
CLARITY (2021)

Singles

References

Pop music duos
Ghanaian emigrants to England
The X Factor (British TV series) contestants
Ghanaian musical groups